Elathalam, or Ilathalam, is a metallic musical instrument which resembles a miniature pair of cymbals. This instrument from Kerala in southern India is completely made out of bronze and has two pieces in it.

Elathalam is played by keeping one part of the cymbal in left hand banging the other cymbal to the one in left hand. Even though this instrument is small by size, it does have more thickness than the common cymbal, and thus gives a distinct chime.

Elathalam is never a lead instrument but is used in a number of ethnic Kerala percussion ensembles like Panchavadyam, Chenda melam, Thayambaka and Kailaya vathiyam besides by second singer on a Kathakali stage beside providing the beat in Kuzhal Pattu and Kombu Pattu.

Masters of Elathalam
Leading elathalam masters of the present day include:Cheriyath Thanku Marar, Chelakkara Unnikrishnan, Maniyamparambil Mani, Kothachira Sekharan Nair, Chengamanad Paramu Nair, Pallavur Raghava Pisharody, Chelakkara Jayan, Pookottur Sasidharan (Asiad Sasi), Guruvayur Velutty and Peruvanam Murali, Ajith marar, panjal velukutty, Venu Bharanganam, Hari Thalanadu, Azhakam Ajayan, mani kenoor, Angadippuram kannan, Chethalloor hari, Kunduvanpadam Sundaran Nair, Chelakkara Suryan, and many

See also

 Pandi Melam
 Panchari melam
 Thayambaka
 Panchavadyam

Arts of Kerala